The 1976 season was Molde's third consecutive year in the top flight, and their 5th season in total in the top flight of Norwegian football. This season Molde competed in 1. divisjon (first tier) and the Norwegian Cup.

In the league, Molde finished in 6th position, 10 points behind winners Lillestrøm.

Season events

Squad
Source:

Friendlies

Competitions

1. divisjon

Results summary 

Source:

Positions by round

Results

Table

Norwegian Cup

Squad statistics

Goalscorers

See also
Molde FK seasons

References

1976
Molde